Richard Johanningmeier (born 1943) is a retired American football player and coach and college athletics administrator. He served as the head football coach at Southwest Missouri State University—now known as Missouri State University from 1976 to 1985 and Illinois College from 1995 to 1997, compiling a career college football coaching record of 64–65–5

Head coaching record

College

References

1943 births
Living people
American football offensive tackles
Continental Football League players
UConn Huskies football coaches
Illinois College Blueboys and Lady Blues athletic directors
Illinois College Blueboys football coaches
Missouri State Bears football coaches
Missouri State Bears football players
Vermont Catamounts football coaches
Washburn Ichabods athletic directors